The 1998 NAPA 500 was the 33rd and final championship event of the 1998 season of the NASCAR Winston Cup Series, held on November 8, 1998, at Atlanta Motor Speedway in Hampton, Georgia. Won by series champion Jeff Gordon, the race was delayed both before its start and twice during the race due to rain showers, causing it to be shortened to 221 laps from its scheduled distance of 325 laps.

This was the last race without Tony Stewart on the grid until the 2013 Cheez-It 355 at The Glen.

Background 
Atlanta Motor Speedway is one of ten intermediate to hold NASCAR races; the others are Charlotte Motor Speedway, Chicagoland Speedway, Darlington Raceway, Homestead Miami Speedway, Kansas Speedway, Kentucky Speedway, Las Vegas Motor Speedway, New Hampshire Motor Speedway, and Texas Motor Speedway. The track's turns are banked at twenty-four degrees, while the front stretch, the location of the finish line, and the back stretch are banked at five. The scheduled race distance was 325 laps, totalling .

Going into the race, Jeff Gordon had clinched the 1998 Winston Cup Series championship the previous weekend at North Carolina Motor Speedway, winning the AC Delco 400 for his 12th win of the season. Rookie driver Harris DeVane, a regular on the ARCA Racing Series, attempted to make his Winston Cup Series debut at the event.

The support race for the event, run on Saturday afternoon, was a 102-lap event sanctioned by the ARCA Bondo/Mar-Hyde Series; Mike Swaim Jr. was the winner of the race.

Qualifying 

Series rookie Kenny Irwin Jr., driving the No. 28 Ford Taurus for Robert Yates Racing, led 48 drivers in qualifying on Friday, November 6, winning his first pole position in the Winston Cup Series. Ward Burton qualified second in the No. 22 Bill Davis Racing Pontiac; Dale Jarrett, Mark Martin, and Mike Skinner filled out the remainder of the top five positions in qualifying; the top 25 drivers in the session were locked into the field, with Ted Musgrave as the 25th and final driver guaranteed a starting spot at the end of the first day of time trials.

Second round qualifying, to set starting positions 26th through 36th on the grid, was held on Saturday, November 7. The only other driver to make an attempt in second round qualifying and move into the top 36 positions, qualifying for the race, was Kevin Lepage, whose time placed him 31st overall.

Dale Earnhardt, Terry Labonte, Ricky Craven, Johnny Benson Jr., Kyle Petty, and Rusty Wallace were forced to take provisional starting positions to start the race. Darrell Waltrip received a provisional as a past series champion and started 43rd; it was the 20th provisional he had used over the course of the season, resulting in a change to eligibility rules for the 1999 series season. Failing to qualify for the race were Rick Mast, Rich Bickle, Steve Grissom, Andy Hillenburg, and Harris DeVane; DeVane was injured in a crash on his qualifying lap and had to be cut from his car, being taken to a hospital as a precautionary measure.

Race 
The start of the race, scheduled for 12:40PM, was delayed 49 minutes due to rain. During the race two additional red flags for rain caused delays of 6 hours and 39 minutes. The delays resulted in the race being the first night race held at the speedway. Due to the delays, during a yellow flag thrown on lap 190 to allow teams to pit under caution on the still-damp pit road, NASCAR announced that once the race resumed, there would be only 25 laps remaining from that point, citing a desire for fans to be able to return home at a safe hour; the race concluded at 11:07pm, a crowd of 50,000 having remained to watch the race to its conclusion.

From a starting position of 21st, Gordon led 113 of the race's 221 laps; he beat Dale Jarrett for the race win by 0.739 second. His victory, the 13th on the season, tied Richard Petty for the most wins by a driver in a single season. Including the rain delays, there were a total of five caution periods during the race, with 68 laps being run under the yellow flag.

Gordon's career victory total stood at 42 after the race; at the time, he was the youngest driver to pass 40 career wins, and the youngest to win a third series title. Gordon topped Mark Martin for the series title by 364 points; Irwin was named the series' Rookie of the Year immediately following the race, beating Kevin Lepage by 14 rookie points.

While the race was the final points event of the season for the Winston Cup Series, an exhibition race at Twin Ring Motegi in Japan was held two weeks later, won by Mike Skinner over Gordon.

Results

Qualifying

Race results

References 

NAPA 500
NAPA 500
NASCAR races at Atlanta Motor Speedway